The long-snouted frog (Litoria longirostris) is a species of frog in the subfamily Pelodryadinae. It is endemic to Australia. The frog is also known as the long-nosed tree frog, scrub rocket frog, and sharp-snouted frog.

Habitat
Its natural habitats in Australia are subtropical or tropical moist lowland forests, intermittent rivers, and intermittent freshwater marshes. It is threatened by habitat loss.

Reproduction
Unlike most Litoria, the long-snouted frog attaches its eggs to tree trunks, rocks, or under leaves out of water.

References

Litoria
Amphibians of Queensland
Taxonomy articles created by Polbot
Amphibians described in 1977
Frogs of Australia